Ella Bergmann-Michel (20 October 1896 – 8 August 1971) was a German abstract artist, photographer and documentary filmmaker.  An early student of constructivist art in Germany, her contributions to modern abstract art are often forgotten in American art culture.  Bergmann-Michel’s style was very specialized and unique, especially considering the restrictive time in which she was actively working.  Most of her work is not titled or signed, making it hard to identify and find in today's art market.

Early life
Bergmann-Michel began making art at an early age.  By 1915 she experimented with a collage technique in the constructivist style.  By using wood, metal and any other obscure material Bergmann-Michel would create very exact and scientific looking collages.  From 1917 to 1920 she studied at the Weimar Hochschule für Bildenden Kunste under the German painter Walther Klemm. By the 1920s Bergmann-Michel had begun to expand her technique even more.  In a time when abstract art was considered a lesser art form, Bergmann-Michel incorporated poetry into abstract pieces; she would paste words of meaning right on top of the canvas, as well as paint words on.  Bergmann became one of the first artists of the constructivist movement to incorporate photography into her artwork, this was a very important advancement of abstract art, one that was used often by more contemporary artists such as Andy Warhol.

Artistic style
Constructivism was an art form developed early in the twentieth century; Vladimir Tatlin first established it.  The new form of art took on different meaning in the different European nations, but the consistency was that it referenced the social and economic problems that the artists felt represented Europe through abstract means. In Bergmann-Michel’s homeland of Germany, Constructivism showed its greatest impact through the Bauhaus school, which was established for the development of the art form. Bergmann-Michel underpinned that she cared “not so much for the concentrated stillness of an object, but for the modern and eventful world" and sought to "record time, similar to the photographs by Xanti Schawinsky."

Marriage and war
In 1919, Bergmann-Michel married Robert Michel. Together they pioneered the use of collage using photographs. Their work was included in Société Anonyme, a collection of works by predominantly European Dada artists. In 1920, Bergmann-Michel and her husband moved to Vockenhausen, near Frankfurt Germany.  While in Frankfurt she decorated much of the Bauhaus school's minimalist walls.  Bergmann-Michel continued doing her art until World War II when she was forced to stop, as the pressure of political events made artistic activity hazardous for her.  Between 1933 and 1945, Bergmann-Michel stayed intermittently in London. Being a failed painter himself, Hitler abhorred abstract art of all types.  Bergmann-Michel worked on her family’s farm until the war ended.  Once the war ended Bergmann-Michel went back to her art. During the 1950s she gave lectures on the development of modern painting and avant-garde films and in the 1960s continued her development of Prism Pictures.  In the later years she continued to make picture collages and vertical/horizontal compositions, none of which are titled.

Legacy 
Through her life Ella Bergmann-Michel toured Zurich, London, Belfast, Poland, Milan, Paris and the United States.  Her art is distinctive, interesting, and found primarily in European art markets.  It is unknown how many paintings and pieces that Bergmann-Michel completed; her art is more important for the movement that it helped to propel, rather than individual pieces themselves.  Bergmann-Michel is one of many lost artists of Germany during the era.

Filmography 

Wo wohnen alte Leute. (1931) 
Erwerbslose kochen für Erwerbslose. (1932)
Fliegende Händler in Frankfurt am Main. (1932)
Fischfang in der Rhön. (1932)
Wahlkampf 1932. (1932/33)

See also
Eppstein
Alexander Rodchenko
Women artists
 List of German women artists

References

External links
 "Ella Bergmann-Michel (1896 - 1971)." 03/06/06 (accessed October 25, 2006).
 "Constructivism: (1913 - 1930)." 02/05/06 (accessed October 25, 2006).
 Peter Nahum At the Leicester Galleries." 03/05/2004 (accessed October 25, 2006).
 "Ella Bergmann-Michel - Fotografien und Filme." 07/01/2005 (accessed October 25, 2006).
 Ella Bergmann-Michel: Documentary films 1931-1933 (accessed August 27, 2013).

1896 births
1971 deaths
German women artists
Place of death missing
Constructivism (art)